The Indigenous ranger projects were introduced by the Australian Government in 2007 as part of its Working on Country program. Indigenous rangers are Indigenous Australians who combine traditional knowledge with conservation training in order to protect and manage their land, sea and culture. Many rangers are employed both in Indigenous Protected Areas (IPAs) and other parts of Australia, including the Torres Strait Islands and other islands. Aboriginal and Torres Strait Islander men and women employed as rangers have reported benefits to wellbeing and as well as benefiting their own and the wider Australian community.

Background and history
Many of Australia's threatened species and ecosystems are located on IPAs and/or in remote parts of Australia, and 19.63% of Australia falls in protected areas, with much of this in remote deserts.

The federal Working on Country program was established by the Howard government in 2007, with the aim of creating meaningful employment, training and career pathways for Aboriginal and Torres Strait Islander people in managing land and sea areas, as well as maintaining their cultures, and sharing their skills and knowledge with others. In turn, this would generate jobs in the  environmental, biosecurity, heritage and other sectors.  the scheme had created more than 2100 full-time, part-time and casual jobs for Indigenous people around the country.

Locations
Many rangers are employed both in Indigenous Protected Areas and other parts of Australia, including the Torres Strait Islands, Flinders Island and Cape Barren Island off Tasmania, and Croker Island and Groote Eylandt off the Northern Territory.

The Budj Bim Rangers, employed by the Winda-Mara Aboriginal Corporation, work across the Budj Bim heritage areas, the site of the wetlands engineered by Gunditjmara people to include a system of aquaculture to trap and farm the short-finned eels (kooyang) in the rich lands of the Budj Bim (Mt Eccles) volcano's lava flow nearly at least 6,600 years ago.

Funding
In April 2018 the government announced that it would commit  in funding until June 2021, which would support 118 ranger groups. The Pew Charitable Trusts' 2019 Budget Submission put forward a case for doubling the annual funding for both Indigenous ranger and Indigenous Protected Area programs over the next five years; 
establishing a long-term target of 5,000 ranger positions nationally, increasing the funding for services supporting the programs, and extending the lengths of contracts to at least ten years, for greater stability.

Country Needs People
Country Needs People is an alliance of more than 40 Aboriginal and Torres Strait Islander organisations, The Pew Charitable Trusts, and  more than 95,000 individuals, campaigning for the growth and security of Indigenous ranger jobs and Indigenous Protected Areas.

Awards

Bardi Jawi Indigenous Rangers won the Banksia Environment Award in 2008.

The World Future Council (WFC) awarded the Indigenous Protected Areas and Indigenous Rangers  programs with the"Bronze Future Policy Award 2017: Desertification".

See also
Budj Bim heritage areas
Natural Heritage Trust

Further reading

References

Indigenous peoples and the environment
Indigenous peoples of Australia
Nature conservation in Australia
2007 introductions